Merseystate is a South African rock band formed by production duo Wayne Joshua and Shai Caleb. The band signed a record deal with local indie Label "Rivendale Records" and released their debut album The Lucky Ones in March 2008 with their first single "New Jersey Girl" rising to number 6 on the Top40 within 3 weeks. Their hit stayed in the charts for 23 consecutive weeks, making it South Africa's longest running 1st Top 40 chart entry of any SA band to date.

External links 
Official website
What's On! Johannesburg: Merseystate's big-bang gig! by Evan Milton

South African pop music groups